Zwanenburg is a town in the Dutch province of North Holland. It is a part of the municipality of Haarlemmermeer, and lies about 11 km west of Amsterdam.

Zwanenburg has a population of around 7,670.

History
Zwanenburg takes its name from Gemeenlandshuis Zwanenburg, the former headquarters of the Hoogheemraadschap Rijnland, a water board that used to have its headquarters in Halfweg, on the other side of the canal known today as the Ringvaart. Up until the 19th century, Zwanenburg was under water. When the pumping station at Halfweg had succeeded in making the land ripe for building, the workers who had settled at Halfweg purchased this cheap land below the dike for their homes. The infrastructure linking Halfweg to Haarlem and Amsterdam was already quite good, so Zwanenburg became a true commuter town. Halfweg was also the site of a large sugar factory, first opened in 1863, that served as an employer for Zwanenburg residents for more than a century. For this reason, the history of Zwanenburg cannot be seen separately from the history of Halfweg.

Halfweg buildings important to Zwanenburg history

References

Populated places in North Holland
Haarlemmermeer